Solid Base is a Swedish-Norwegian Euro-Dance duo.

The lead singer in the group was Isabelle Heitmann, who was born in Oslo, Norway in 1972. She had a passion for singing since her childhood, and at the age of 10 she moved to Gothenburg, Sweden. A few years after she had moved to Stockholm, she started to sing in various talent competitions. One day she got a phone call from producer Pat Reiniz asking her to sing for him. She ended up singing for Cool James and Black Teacher on their album. At work, she met a man named Niclas Lindberg who recommended her for the Solid Base project. 

Rapper Thomas Nordin or Teo T (born 1971) spent his youth living in places like Saudi Arabia, Africa and Indonesia. Once back in Stockholm, he dedicated his time to the growing music life of Stockholm. Teo met the producers Jonas Eriksson and Mattias Eliasson and together they formed the idea of Solid Base.

In 1994, Solid Base released their first single "Together". They then released several other singles and gained success in Europe. In 1996, their debut album Finally was released. It included hit songs like "Mirror Mirror", "You Never Know" and "Let It All Be Sunshine". Two years later, they released their second album The Take Off where the song "Come'n Get Me" is probably their most well-known. The band's second album, The Take Off, was successful in Japan, being certified gold by the RIAJ in 1998.

The last CD of the 1990s they made was in 1999 with Express. By 2001, Solid Base released the album Party Totale! in Germany. Their last studio album was In Action from 2002. In 2004, The Greatest Hits was released; a Greatest Hits DVD with music videos was also released.

In 2013, they gained cult fame when a rendition of their song "I Like It" was performed by a plastic toy goose in a YouTube video made by British filmmaker and internet personality Stuart Ashen.

Solid Base returned in 2014 and did a lot of shows around Scandinavia, with Camilla Alvestad as the vocalist.

September 2015, Solid Base released a new single called "Wet" (with Camilla Alvestad)
January 2017, Solid Base released a new single "We're Gonna Rock It!" (Camilla Alvestad)

Later 2017 Camilla Alvestad left and Veronika Färestål joined as new vocalist.

In 2018, Veronika left and Jenny Redenkvist joined as new vocalist.

Discography

Albums
1996 – Finally
1998 – The Take Off
1999 – Express
2001 – Party Totale
2002 – In Action
2002 – Greatest Hits
2004 – Greatest Hits (20 tracks, + 9 bonus DVD features)

Singles

References

External links
Official webpage

Swedish dance music groups
Swedish Eurodance groups
Swedish electronic music groups
Norwegian dance music groups
Norwegian Eurodance groups
Norwegian electronic music groups